Journey to the End of the Night (1932) is the first novel by Louis-Ferdinand Céline. This semi-autobiographical work follows the adventures of Ferdinand Bardamu in World War I, colonial Africa, the United States and the poor suburbs of Paris where he works as a doctor.

The novel won the Prix Renaudot in 1932 but divided critics due to the author's pessimistic depiction of the human condition and his innovative writing style based on working class speech, slang and neologisms. It is now widely considered to be one of the greatest novels of the twentieth century.

Background 
Céline began writing Journey to the End of the Night, his first novel, in 1929 while he was working as a doctor in a public clinic in the working class Paris suburb of Clichy. The novel draws on his experience in the French cavalry during World War One, his time in colonial Africa as an employee of a French forestry company, his 1925 visit to the United States as a health officer with the League of Nations, and his experiences as a doctor in Paris. He completed the novel in late 1931 and submitted it to two small publishers and the major publisher Gallimard, before it was accepted by a fourth publisher, Denoël et Steele, which had recently had a success with Eugène Dabit's L'Hôtel du Nord. Journey to the End of the Night was published in October 1932.

The title stems from the first stanza of a song attributed by the author to the "Swiss Guards (1793)", and whose French translation is the epigraph of Céline's book: «Notre vie est un voyage / Dans l'Hiver et dans la Nuit / Nous cherchons notre passage / Dans le Ciel où rien ne luit» (Our life is a journey / Through Winter and Night; / We look for our way / In a sky without light). (In reality, the Swiss Guards were abolished in France in 1792. The text is from the poem "Die Nachtreise" (1792) by Karl Ludwig Giesecke. The poem was later set to music by Friedrich Wilke, and was associated with the French invasion of Russia, in which some Swiss regiments were deployed.)

Plot summary 
Ferdinand Bardamu is a young Parisian medical student who, in a fit of enthusiasm, voluntarily enlists in the French army on the outbreak of World War One. During his first engagement with the enemy he decides that the war doesn’t make any sense and he needs to clear out. Alone on a nocturnal reconnaissance mission, he meets a French reservist named Léon Robinson who wants to be captured by the Germans so he can sit out the war in the relative safety of a prisoner of war camp. Bardamu and Robinson make their way to a French town but there are no Germans there to surrender to. Disappointed, they go their separate ways.

Bardamu is wounded in action and receives the médaille militaire. On convalescent leave in Paris, he meets an American volunteer nurse named Lola with whom he has an affair. They visit an amusement park where Bardamu suffers a nervous breakdown at the shooting gallery. He tells Lola that he rejects the war because he doesn't want to die for nothing. Lola tells him he is a coward and leaves him.

Bardamu begins a relationship with Musyne, a violinist. However, she soon leaves him for a succession of rich Argentinians who have profited from the war. He is transferred to a hospital which specialises in electrical therapy and patriotic psychiatry. He is eventually pronounced psychologically unfit for service and discharged from the military.

Bardamu travels to French colonial Africa where he is put in charge of a trading post in the jungle interior. Here he becomes friends with Alcide, his colleague in the French administration. Bardamu finds that the trading post is only a dilapidated hut, and the man he is relieving is Robinson. Robinson tells him that the company cheats its employees and the natives so it is sensible to cheat the company. Robinson sneaks away during the night. After a few weeks, Bardamu catches a fever and sets fire to the trading post in his delirium.

Fearing punishment for defrauding the company, Bardamu decides to flee to the coast. Natives from the nearby village carry Bardamu, who is still delirious, to a Spanish colony where a priest sells him to a ship owner as a galley slave.

The ship sails to New York where Bardamu is put into quarantine until his fever subsides. He talks his way into a job with the quarantine authority and is sent into Manhattan on an errand. He goes in search of Lola and eventually tracks her down. She is now rich and eager to be rid of him. She gives him a hundred dollars and he leaves for Detroit in search of work.

He is employed on the assembly line at Ford Motor Company but finds the work exhausting and dehumanising. He falls in love with a prostitute named Molly who wants him to settle down in America with her but he confesses his mania for escaping from whatever situation he is in. He runs into Robinson and is surprised to learn that he has failed to make anything of himself in America. He decides to return to France and finish his medical training.

Back in Paris, Bardamu completes his medical studies and starts a practice in the bleak (fictitious) suburb of La Garenne-Rancy. The residents are mostly too poor to pay him and he mainly deals with the consequences of botched abortions and takes on hopeless cases which other doctors won't touch. His patients include Madame Henrouille and her husband whose mother, Grandma Henrouille, lives in a shed behind their house. They want her committed to a mental asylum but Bardamu refuses to help them. They hire Robinson to kill her but the booby trap he prepares for her explodes in his face, blinding him.

In an attempt to hush the scandal, the Henrouilles arrange for Robinson and Grandma Henrouille to manage a mummy exhibit in the crypt of a church in Toulouse. The old woman turns the exhibit into a profitable venture. Robinson, whose eyesight is gradually improving, becomes engaged to a woman named Madelon who sells candles at the church and has been caring for him. Robinson and Madelon plan to murder Grandma Henrouille and take over the exhibit. One night Robinson pushes the old woman down the steep staircase to the crypt, killing her.

Meanwhile, Bardamu finds a job in a lunatic asylum on the outskirts of Paris. The director of the asylum, Dr. Baryton, starts taking English lessons from Bardamu. Moved by the Elizabethan poets and the tragic history of Monmouth the pretender, Baryton loses all interest in psychiatry and leaves for England, putting Bardamu in charge of the asylum. In Baryton's clinic Bardamu has a new affair with Sophie, a nurse from Slovakia.

Robinson meets Bardamu and explains that he has left Madelon and their lucrative job at the crypt because he doesn't want her and her love. Bardamu allows him to stay at the asylum and gives him a menial job. Madelon tracks Robinson down and threatens to turn him in to the police if he doesn't marry her. Sophie, suggests that she and Bardamu should go on a double date with Robinson and Madelon in order to reconcile them. The four go to a carnival but during the taxi ride back to the asylum Robinson tells Madelon that he doesn't want to be with her because love disgusts him. They have a violent argument and Madelon shoots Robinson and flees. Robinson dies and Bardamu reflects that he hasn't yet been able to find an idea bigger than death.

Major themes 
Journey to the End of the Night reflects a pessimistic view of the human condition in which suffering, old age and death are the only eternal truths. Life is miserable for the poor, futile for the rich, and hopes for human progress and happiness are illusory.

Céline's biographer Patrick McCarthy argues that hate is a central theme of the novel. Célinian man suffers from an original sin of malicious hatred, but there is no God to redeem him. Hate gives the characters "a concrete, if illusory, reason for their unhappiness." Moreover: "The characteristic trait of Célinian hatred is that it is gratuitous: one does not dislike because the object of dislike has harmed one; one hates because one has to"

War is another major theme. According to Merlin Thomas, Céline presents the horror and stupidity of war as an implacable force which "turns the ordinary individual into an animal intent only on survival". It is the poor who always suffer most. Bardamu sees war as simply a means for the rich to cull the poor.

Céline also explores the theme of survival in a hostile world. Although Célinian man can't escape his fate, according to McCarthy: "he has some control over his death. He need not be arbitrarily slaughtered in battle and he need not blind himself with divertissements. He can choose to face death, a more painful but more dignified process."

Thomas points out that Bardamu learns that although the poor and weak cannot avoid their fate, they can choose defiance. "If you are weak, then you will derive strength from stripping those you fear of all the prestige they pretend to possess.…[T]he attitude of defiance just outlined is an element of hope and personal salvation."

Bardamu also finds some consolation in contemplating human beauty and rare instances of human kindness. Bardamu admires Molly not just for her physical beauty but for her simple generosity. When Alcide volunteers for another stint in colonial Africa in order to pay for the education of his orphaned niece, Bardamu thinks he is acting foolishly, but admires his good intentions.

Style 
In Journey to the End of the Night, Céline developed a unique literary language based on the spoken French of the working class, medical and nautical jargon, neologisms, obscenities, and the specialised slang of soldiers, sailors and the criminal underworld. Reviewing the novel in 1932, a critic for Les Nouvelles littéraires praised its "extraordinary language, the height of the natural and the artificial" while the critic for Le Populaire de Paris condemned it as mere vulgarity and obscenity.

The novel is a first-person narrative. Thomas describes the narrative voice as clinical and detached – the voice of the experienced doctor observing the world through the eyes of his youthful alter ego Bardamu. The clinical tone is frequently associated with sardonic commentary and black humour derived from the futile efforts of characters to control their environment and escape their fate. As McCarthy notes: "It is not just that all men must die, but that each moment of their lives is rendered futile. Everything they do is ridiculous."

The clinical and detached narrative voice occasionally gives way to an hallucinatory delirium. Sometimes this is associated with a fever or psychological stress, sometimes it occurs without apparent cause. Vitoux states: "Delirium is the second state of existence that distances dull, prosaic reality, and an excess of which makes the writer (like his hero) incomparably clear-sighted in the very depths of his misery, enabling him to distinguish the true poetic and convulsive realities contained in life and death."

Reception and critical reputation 
Journey to the End of the Night was published in October 1932 to widespread critical attention. The novel attracted admirers and detractors across the political spectrum, with some praising its anarchist, anticolonialist and antimilitarist themes while one critic condemned it as "the cynical, jeering confessions of a man without courage or nobility." The novel was the favourite for the Prix Goncourt of 1932. When the prize was awarded to Guy Mazeline', Les Loups, the resulting scandal increased publicity for Céline's novel which sold 50,000 copies in the following two months. The novel was awarded the Prix Renaudot in 1932.

Journey to the End of the Night is now considered to be one of the great works of European literature. In 2003 the novel appeared on The Guardian's list of "100 Greatest Novels of All Time". In 1999 it was ranked sixth on Le Monde’s list of 100 novels of the twentieth century.

Publication history
 Céline, Louis-Ferdinand (1932). Voyage au bout de la nuit, Paris, Denöel et Steele.

See also

 Le Monde 100 Books of the Century

References

1932 French novels
French autobiographical novels
Novels by Louis-Ferdinand Céline
Novels set in colonial Africa
Novels set in Paris
Novels set during World War I
Personal accounts of World War I
1932 debut novels
Novels set in New York City
Novels set in the 1920s